Delias baracasa is a butterfly in the family Pieridae. It was described by Georg Semper in 1890. It is found in the Indomalayan realm.

The wingspan is about 50 mm. Adults may be distinguished by the blackened vein markings on the underside of the hindwings.

Subspecies
D. b. baracasa (Malaysia, Philippines: Mindanao)
D. b. basilana Schroeder & Treadaway, 2008 (Philippines: Basilan)
D. b. benguetana Inomata, 1979 (Philippines)
D. b. cathara Grose-Smith, 1893 (Borneo)
D. b. danala (de Nicéville, 1893) (north-eastern Sumatra, south-western Sumatra)
D. b. dives de Nicéville, 1897 (Peninsular Malaysia)
D. b. kalimantana Yagishita, 1993 (western Kalimantan: Mt.Saran)

References

External links
Delias at Markku Savela's Lepidoptera and Some Other Life Forms

baracasa
Butterflies described in 1890